() or , rendered in English as Snawk, Snawq, Sneawq, or Snawkw, is a village site of the Indigenous Squamish people, located near what is now known as the Kitsilano neighbourhood of Vancouver, British Columbia, Canada. The village site was home for many Squamish, but after further settlement began in the Vancouver area, the inhabitants were forced to relocate to other nearby villages. This village was also the home of August Jack Khatsahlano, a prominent chief (or ) of the Squamish and a notable Vancouver historian on local Indigenous history.

History 

After the Indian Act was passed in 1876, and with the Joint Indian Reserve Commission, a reserve was plotted out for the native peoples living at this location. Both in 1886 and 1902, portions of the reserve were expropriated by the federal government for railway purposes. In 1913 the B.C. Provincial Government induced the residents to relocate by coercing them to sell, an action which was later found to be illegal. Many families were placed on a barge and towed to other communities in the Burrard Inlet area.

In 2019, the Squamish Nation announced plans to build a housing development on this land. Initially planned for 3,000 units, it was later increased to 6,000 units. The tallest buildings in the development will be 56 storeys and are exempt from local height restrictions. The development will also include 886 vehicle parking spaces, 4,477 bicycle parking spots, parkspace, and a transit hub on the south end of the bridge. At the project's groundbreaking ceremony on September 6, 2022, Canadian prime minister Justin Trudeau announced a $1.4 billion federal government loan to the Squamish First Nation for the development.

See also 

 Squamish history
 List of Squamish villages

References

External links 

 
 Map of Reserve Lands, 1934

Squamish villages
History of Vancouver
Former populated places in British Columbia